Aplysia dactylomela, the spotted sea hare, is a species of large sea slug, a marine opisthobranch gastropod in the family Aplysiidae, the sea hares.

Distribution and taxonomy
As traditionally defined, this species of sea hare was cosmopolitan, being found in almost all tropical and warm temperate seas, including the Mediterranean Sea where first seen in 2002 and likely self-established due to increasing temperatures.

Based on genetic evidence, the population from the Indo-Pacific region is now recognized as a separate species, A. argus. This restricts the true A. dactylomela to the Atlantic Ocean region, including the Caribbean and Mediterranean. The appearance of the two species is very similar, although A. argus is more variable in colour and pattern.

Description

The colour of the spotted sea hare is very variable, from pale gray to green, to dark brown. There are almost always large black rings on the mantle.

The maximum recorded length is 410 mm.

Habitat
Aplysia dactylomela is commonly found in shallow waters, tide pools and rocky and sandy substrates, they also will be found feeding in beds of sea grass. During the day they will mostly hide under large rocks and in crevices. They usually stay in relatively shallow water, but they have been found as deep as 40 m.

Minimum recorded depth is 0 m. Maximum recorded depth is 3 m.

Human use
The right giant neuron of Aplysia dactylomela, which is found in the abdominal ganglion, is similar to that of vertebrates, meaning it is ideal for the study of electrophysiology, as well as conditioned-response studies. These neurons have been found to be invaluable in neurological research; the reason for this is that long-lasting effects in neuronal behavior can be detected.

Behaviour
The Aplysia dactylomela is capable of swimming and crawling. It accomplishes the former by creating a funnel using the parapodia folded forward and downwards; this action pulls in water. It then pushes the water out from behind the animal by pressing the anterior parts of the parapodia together, thus forward motion is achieved.

The sea hare's usual mode of propulsion is crawling; it crawls by lifting the front end of the foot, stretching it forward then placing it on the ground in front, creating an arching pattern; the remainder of the body follows this arching pattern until the tail is reached.

Defense 
Like the octopus, the Aplysia dactylomela squirts purple ink if it is disturbed; this ink is an irritant that causes 'altered behaviour' in other invertebrates and fish. Their leathery skin contains toxins which make this sea hare practically inedible to most predators.

References

Further reading
 Bebbington A. (1974) Aplysiid species from East Africa with notes on the Indian Ocean Aplysiomorpha (Gastropoda: Opisthobranchia). Zoological Journal of the Linnean Society 54(1): 63-99
 Bebbington A. (1977) Aplysiid species from Eastern Australia with notes on the Pacific Ocean Aplysiomorpha (Gastropoda, Opisthobranchia). Transactions of the Zoological Society of London 34: 87-147.
 Rosenberg, G. 1992. Encyclopedia of Seashells. Dorset: New York. 224 pp. page(s): 118
 Richmond, M. (Ed.) (1997). A guide to the seashores of Eastern Africa and the Western Indian Ocean islands. Sida/Department for Research Cooperation, SAREC: Stockholm, Sweden. . 448 pp.
 Gofas, S.; Le Renard, J.; Bouchet, P. (2001). Mollusca, in: Costello, M.J. et al. (Ed.) (2001). European register of marine species: a check-list of the marine species in Europe and a bibliography of guides to their identification. Collection Patrimoines Naturels, 50: pp. 180–213
  Branch, G.M. et al. (2002). Two Oceans. 5th impression. David Philip, Cate Town & Johannesburg
 Rolán E., 2005. Malacological Fauna From The Cape Verde Archipelago. Part 1, Polyplacophora and Gastropoda
 Rosenberg, G., F. Moretzsohn, and E. F. García. 2009. Gastropoda (Mollusca) of the Gulf of Mexico, Pp. 579–699 in Felder, D.L. and D.K. Camp (eds.), Gulf of Mexico–Origins, Waters, and Biota. Biodiversity. Texas A&M Press, College Station, Texas

External links

 Aplysia dactylomela at Sea Slug Forum
 Aplysia dactylomela at Animal Diversity Web
 Aplysia dactylomela at Slugsite
Aplysia datylomela at Bermuda Dept. Conservation Services (includes video)
 

dactylomela
Gastropods described in 1828
Molluscs of the Atlantic Ocean